The Tainan Astronomical Education Area (TAEA) is an educational center in Quxi Village, Danei District, Tainan, Taiwan.

History
In 2002, Danei Township was selected as the site to construct the building. Being the first phase of the construction, the observatory was constructed starting 2004 and completed on 11 August 2006. It was then opened for use on 1 January 2007. The main construction was completed in 2012. It started its trial operation on 1 February 2013 and was officially opened on 29 June 2013.

Architecture
Located at an elevation of 110 meters above sea level, the complex consists of observatory, astronomy museum and planetarium. It features a 76 cm telescope, the largest telescope on ground level in Taiwan.

See also
 List of tourist attractions in Taiwan

References

External links

 

2013 establishments in Taiwan
Buildings and structures completed in 2012
Buildings and structures in Tainan
Astronomical observatories in Taiwan
Science centers in Taiwan
Tourist attractions in Tainan
Planetaria in Taiwan